Rasam is a spicy South Indian soup. While it is sometimes served on its own as a soup, it is usually served as a side dish with rice. In a traditional South Indian meal, it is part of a course that includes sambar rice and curd rice. Rasam has a distinct taste in comparison to sambar due to its own seasoning ingredients and is fluid in consistency. Chilled prepared versions are marketed commercially as well as rasam paste in bottles.

A variety of rasam is the Tamil soup dish mulligatawny.

Origin

In South Indian households rasam commonly refers to a soup prepared with sweet-sour stock made from either kokum or tamarind, along with tomato and lentil, added spices and garnish.

The name rasam is derived from Sanskrit ; transliterated: , meaning sap, juice, or essence. The Sanskrit word also yielded the English word rasa, in the aesthetic sense.

Ingredients
Rasam is prepared mainly with a tart base such as kokum, malabar tamarind (kudam puli), tamarind, ambula, amchur (dried green mango), tomato, or buttermilk stock depending on the region. A dal or lentil stock (for rasam, the typical dal used is split yellow pigeon peas or mung beans) is optional but are used in several rasam recipes. Jaggery, cumin, black pepper, turmeric, mustard seeds, lemon, chilli powder, curry leaves, garlic, shallots and coriander may be used as flavoring ingredients and garnish in South India.

Types

Different kinds of rasam are listed below with its main ingredients.

Koẕi rasam – chicken
Kaḍalai rasam – black chickpeas
Venkāya rasam – Eggplant
Kattu sāru – Togari bele and Byadgi chillies
Huruli sāru - made from Horsegram (Kudu in Tulu)
Tili sāru – sieving water from plain rice
Thakkāḷi rasam – tomato puree
Pūndu rasam – garlic
Inji rasam – ginger
Panasa tona charu - jackfruit (ripe)
Mudakathān rasam – balloon vine
Māngā rasam – raw or semi-ripe mango
Elumichai rasam – lemon juice
Nellikkāi rasam – Indian gooseberry
Murungai pū rasam – drumstick flower
Vēpam pū rasam – neem flower
Kandathippili rasam – greens
Bassāru/kattu sāru – boiled vegetables/greens/lentils
Miḷagu rasam (mulligatawny) – black pepper
Jīraga rasam – cumin
Beetroot rasam
Black pepper sāru – Black pepper (Karimenasu in Kannada)
Puḷi rasam – kokum or tamarind extract
Hesaru kālu sāru – green gram
Paruppu rasam / pappu sāru – pulses and tomato stock
Baellae sāru – pigeon pea lentil
Kattina sāru – jaggery
Mysore rasam – fried lentils

See also
 List of soups

References

Andhra cuisine
Foods containing coconut
Indian curries
Indian soups and stews
Karnataka cuisine
Kerala cuisine
South Indian cuisine
Tamil cuisine
Telangana cuisine
Vegetarian dishes of India
Sri Lankan soups and stews